A list of films produced in France in 1957.

See also
 1957 in France
 1957 in French television

References

External links
 French films of 1957 at the Internet Movie Database
French films of 1957 at Cinema-francais.fr

1957
Films
French